MBDA Deutschland GmbH is a German missile systems company. Together with its 100% subsidiaries Bayern-Chemie and TDW and various Joint Ventures, it forms MBDA Germany. The company is a legally independent 100% subsidiary of MBDA which belongs to Airbus, BAE Systems and Leonardo. In addition to the headquarters in Schrobenhausen, the company has sites in Ulm and Aschau am Inn.

MBDA Germany is the leading missile systems company in Germany and part of the European MBDA Group. MBDA Germany develops, manufactures and provides customer and product support for guided missile systems and subsystems to the Air Force, Army and Navy. Today the company focuses on air defense systems. MBDA Germany has also a leading position in the field of laser weapons technologies. It has 1300 employees and with an annual sales of 400 million euros in 2011.
 
From 2006 to April 2012, the headquarters in Schrobenhausen was enhanced and modernized. For this reason, modern laboratory- and office buildings, a new integration hall and a simulation centre were built. Furthermore, there is a new staff restaurant, a car park and a gym. Overall, MBDA Germany invested more than €60 million in new infrastructure.

Products

MBDA Germany product range:

 Taurus KEPD 350
 MILAN
 MEADS
 MIM-104 Patriot
 LFK NG
 PARS 3 LR
 RAM

References

External links
 http://www.mbda-systems.com

Guided missile manufacturers
Defence companies of Germany